The Miss Universo Uruguay 2014 was held on January 19, 2014. The winner will represent Uruguay at Miss Universe 2014. There were 15 candidates competing for the one title. The pageant was held poolside at the Hotel Punta del Este Arenas.

Results

Special awards
 Best Face - Laura Fernandez
 Best Body - Cecilia Ortega Paredes
 Miss Photogenic - Giana Muniz
 Best Catwalk - Serrana Silva Rivero
 Best Hair: Natalia Pazos Valeri
 Best Legs: Agustina Barreiro
 Miss Poise: Giana Muniz
 Best Skin: Victoria Garcia
 Miss Elegance - Victoria Garcia
 Miss Congeniality - Florencia Mendez
 Natural Beauty - Romina Fernandez

Delegates

Official website
Miss Universo Uruguay

Miss Universo Uruguay
2014 in Uruguay
2014 beauty pageants